Denny Bruce (born in 1944 in Lancaster, Pennsylvania) is an American record producer and artist manager.

Biography
While living in Los Angeles in 1965, Bruce was hired by Frank Zappa as a second drummer with The Mothers of Invention. After six months, he contracted mononucleosis and was forced to leave the group. He was replaced by Billy Mundi.

Bruce launched a career in artist management and record production with his first artist signed, Lisa Kindred, and soon added Magic Sam, Albert Collins and Earl Hooker. He later became A&R consultant to Blue Thumb Records, working with such artists as Ike and Tina Turner, Charlie Musselwhite, and Robbie Basho.

After the death of Magic Sam in 1969, Bruce worked as Tour Manager of Buffy Sainte-Marie. He formed a production company with Jack Nitzsche and songwriter Gerry Goffin. They worked out of Goffin's new Larabee Studios in West Hollywood.

While working for Vanguard Records he started producing John Fahey and through Fahey and his label, Takoma Records, he began his management and producer's relationship with Leo Kottke. He produced all seven albums for Kottke on Capitol Records.

He later teamed up with Chrysalis Records in 1979 to purchase Fahey's Takoma Records. Bruce brought Jon Monday into the company to continue as General Manager. Monday had been with Takoma since 1970, and was their first full-time employee. Bruce signed and produced The Fabulous Thunderbirds, and signed T-Bone Burnett, Charles Bukowski,  and other notable artists to the new Takoma label.

In 1984, he managed "The Blasters" who released the album "Hard Line" on Slash/Warner Bros., as well as the Gun Club.
 
He served as pop music consultant to UCLA's Department of Fine Arts as well as at the Austin Performing Arts Center in Austin, Texas.

In 2000, Bruce and Bill Coben launched Benchmark Recordings with the original four The Fabulous Thunderbirds albums and a live album by Mike Bloomfield. In 2008, Bruce retired as president and the company brought in long-time friend of the founders, Jon Monday, to run the label. The company is now co-owned by Bill Coben and Jon Monday.

Credits
1968 - Playback, Appletree Theatre / The Appletree Theatre, Percussion
1968 - Head, The Monkees, Percussion 
1969 - Further on Up the Road, Shakey Jake Harris, Percussion
1970 - Bad Rice, Ron Nagle, Memorabilia, Photo Courtesy
1971 - Mudlark, Leo Kottke, Producer, Composer
1972 - Of Rivers & Religion, John Fahey, Producer
1972 - Greenhouse, Leo Kottke, Producer
1972 - Artist Proof, Chris Darrow, Producer
1973 - My Feet Are Smiling, Leo Kottke, Producer, Composer
1973 - After the Ball, John Fahey, Producer
1974 - Ice Water, Leo Kottke, Producer
1974 - Dreams and All That Stuff, Leo Kottke, Producer
1975 - Stranger's Bed, Michael Fennelly, Producer
1975 - Chewing Pine, Leo Kottke, Producer
1976 - Leo Kottke 1971-1976: Did You Hear Me?, Leo Kottke, Producer, Photography
1976 - Leo Kottke , Leo Kottke, Producer
1977 - I'm with You Always, Mike Bloomfield, Producer
1978 - Burnt Lips, Leo Kottke, Producer
1979 - The Fabulous Thunderbirds , The Fabulous Thunderbirds, Producer
1979 - Slug Line, John Hiatt, Producer
1980 - What's the Word, The Fabulous Thunderbirds, Producer, Liner Notes
1980 - Two Bit Monsters, John Hiatt, Producer
1980 - Truth Decay, T-Bone Burnett, Director
1980 - Ron Cuccia and the Jazz Poetry Group, Ron Cuccia, Producer
1980 - Rock Therapy, Colin Winski, Producer
1981 - Eye of the Storm, Max Buda / Chris Darrow, Producer
1981 - Butt Rockin' , The Fabulous Thunderbirds, Producer, Liner Notes
1982 - T-Bird Rhythm, The Fabulous Thunderbirds, Liner Notes
1983 - Live Texas Tornado, The Sir Douglas Quintet, Producer
1983 - Border Wave, The Sir Douglas Quintet, Executive Producer
1984 - Soulful Dress, Marcia Ball, Producer
1984 - Forget About the Danger, The LeRoi Brothers, Producer
1985 - Tales of the New West, Beat Farmers, Project Assistant
1985 - Out of the Blue [Rykodisc] , Various, Producer
1987 - The Best of Jerry Butler [Rhino] , Jerry Butler, Liner Notes
1987 - The Best, Leo Kottke, Producer, Composer
1989 - Y'All Caught? The Ones That Got Away 1979–1985, John Hiatt, Producer
1989 - Poor and Famous, Beat Farmers, Executive Producer
1990 - Loud and Plowed and...LIVE!!, Beat Farmers, Producer
1990 - Alien in My Own Home, Tony Mathews, Art Direction
1991 - The Essential, The Fabulous Thunderbirds, Producer
1991 - Listen to the Band, The Monkees, Percussion
1991 - Jazzspeak, Various, Overdubs
1991 - Greetings from Kartoonistan...(We Ain't Dead Yet), Kaleidoscope, Production Coordination, Project Coordinator
1991 - Essential, Leo Kottke, Producer
1992 - Blues Masters, Vol. 4: Harmonica Classics, Various, Producer
1993 - Slug Line/Two Bit Monsters, John Hiatt, Producer
1994 - Hostage, Charles Bukowski, Producer, Editing
1995 - Blues Masters, Vols. 1–5, Various, Producer
1996 - Living a Little, Laughing a Little, John Hiatt, Producer
1996 - How I Learned to Stop, Various, Producer
1996 - Different Tacos, The Fabulous Thunderbirds, Producer
1996 - Cowabunga! The Surf Box, Various, Producer
1996 - Butt Rockin'/T-Bird Rhythm, The Fabulous Thunderbirds, Producer
1997 - The Best of Michael Bloomfield [Fantasy], Michael Bloomfield, Compilation Producer, Reissue Producer, Reissue Compiler
1997 - Takoma Eclectic Sampler, Various, Producer, Compilation Producer, Reissue Producer, Liner Notes
1997 - Standing in My Shoes, Leo Kottke, Composer
1997 - Same/What's the Word, The Fabulous Thunderbirds, Producer
1997 - Chicago Blues Masters, Vol. 3, Various, Percussion
1998 - Hallelujah! Evolution!, Dr. Stephen Baird, Producer
1998 - Anthology, The Monkees, Percussion
1999 - Unassigned Territory, David Pritchard, Executive Producer
1999 - Takoma Slide, Various, Producer, Compilation Producer, Liner Notes
1999 - Takoma Eclectic Sampler, Vol. 2, Various, Producer, Compilation Producer, Reissue Producer, Liner Notes
1999 - Natural Selection [Zebra], Various, Executive Producer
2000 - Let the Boy Jam, Nick Binkley, Producer
2000 - Is It Over?/They Found Me Guilty, Billy Price Keystone Rhythm Band, Producer
2001 - Three Piece Suite: The Reprise Recordings 1971–1974, Jack Nitzsche, Producer, Liner Notes
2001 - Music Box, The Monkees, Percussion
2001 - Greatest Hits and More, John Hiatt, Producer
2001 - Girls Go Wild, The Fabulous Thunderbirds, Producer
2001 - Anthology, John Hiatt, Producer
2003 - The Essential Jimmie Vaughan, Jimmie Vaughan, Producer
2003 - The Best of the Capitol Years, Leo Kottke, Producer
2003 - Tacos Deluxe, The Fabulous Thunderbirds, Producer, Liner Notes
2003 - Roulettes, The Roulettes, Producer
2004 - Of Rivers & Religion/After the Ball, John Fahey / John Fahey & His Orchestra, Producer
2010 - Perpendicular Worlds, Toulouse Engelhardt, Liner Notes
2011 - Monkeemania: The Very Best of The Monkees, The Monkees, Percussion
2014 - From His Head to His Heart to His Hands, Michael Bloomfield, Producer
2016 - The Monkees 50, The Monkees, Percussion
2021 - The Jimmie Vaughan Story, Jimmie Vaughan, Producer

References

1944 births
American music managers
Record producers from Pennsylvania
Living people
Businesspeople from Lancaster, Pennsylvania